Bartmann is a surname. Notable people with the surname include:

Aina Bartmann (born 1959), Norwegian politician 
Bill Bartmann (1948–2016), American businessman
Dominik Bartmann (born 1953), German art historian and curator
Kim Bartmann Minneapolis restaurateur 
Wahl Bartmann (born 1963), South African rugby union player

See also
Bartmann jug
Bartman (disambiguation)